César Tajan Jiménez (born 25 June 1991) is a Colombian footballer who plays for Albion FC. He was born in Cartagena.

References

1991 births
Living people
Colombian footballers
Association football forwards
Once Caldas footballers
Real Cartagena footballers
Central Español players
Club Atlético River Plate (Montevideo) players
Centro Atlético Fénix players
Uruguayan Primera División players
Uruguayan Segunda División players
Categoría Primera A players
Categoría Primera B players
Colombian expatriate footballers
Expatriate footballers in Uruguay
Sportspeople from Cartagena, Colombia
21st-century Colombian people